Langore is a village in Cornwall, England. It is in the parish of St Stephens by Launceston Rural (where the population of the 2011 census was included.) and is about halfway between St Stephens and Egloskerry.

References

Villages in Cornwall